Dmitri Linter (born November 22, 1973) is a  counselor of vice-director of Russian Military Historical Society  He is also a pro-Kremlin political activist, who has worked as vice deputy of the Coordination Centre "Novorossiya" on human rights and humanitarian activities.
He was one of leaders of the Nochnoy Dozor advocacy group that opposed the relocation of the Bronze Soldier of Tallinn memorial in 2007. In March 2014 he called for the formation of groups of volunteers to "correct holiday in the Crimea."
In October 2014 Dmitri Linter acted as counselor and project manager during a visit to Riga of Russian Minister of Culture Vladimir Medinsky.

Biography 

Linter was born on November 22, 1973 in Tallinn, Estonia. Linter's mother is Leonora Linter.

Political career
 In the European Parliament elections of 2004 he was a candidate of the "Russian Party in Estonia", and received 107 votes. 
 In the parliamentary elections in Estonia in 2007, he was candidate of the Constitution Party, gathering a total of 122 votes.

Arrest 
On April 27, 2007, Dmitri Linter was arrested on charges of organizing mass riots. His wife, Marina Linter, has asserted the alibi that on the night of April 26 Dmitri Linter was at home "keeping multiple contacts with the press". Marina Linter claimed that despite all the pleas of his wife neither Linter's location nor his state of health were revealed. According to representatives of the prosecutor general's office of Estonia, it was part of an ordinary investigation. The content of the interrogation and the testimony are not made public in such cases in the interests of the investigation.

On November 16, 2007, after 7 months of imprisonment, Dmitri Linter and another leader of the Night Watch, Maxim Reva, were released on bail.

Trial
On January 5, 2009 Dmitri Linter, charged with organization of riots during Bronze Night, was found not guilty by the District Court of Harjumaa.

See also
Johan Bäckman
Russian influence operations in Estonia
World Without Nazism

References

External links
Official charges to  Dmitri Linter  

Estonian people of Russian descent
1973 births
Living people
Pro-Russian people of the 2014 pro-Russian unrest in Ukraine
People from Tallinn